Joan Constance Bartels (born May 21, 1953) is a retired American children's singer-songwriter, recording artist, and occasional actress based in New Zealand. Her 1985 album, Lullaby Magic, was certified gold by the Recording Industry Association of America in 1992.

Early life 
Bartels was born in Dorchester, Massachusetts, a neighborhood of Boston on May 21, 1953. Her father was a native of Southport, North Carolina and her mother was a native of Sharon, Massachusetts. She is a graduate of Natick High School.

She has her own recording company called Purple Frog Records, and created Put on Your Dancing Shoes and Dreamland.

She was married in 2006, and officially moved to New Zealand.

Discography

Albums 
 Sillytime Magic (1980)
 Lullaby Magic (1985)
 Morning Magic (1986)
 Lullaby Magic, Vol. 2 (1987)
 Travelin' Magic (1988)
 Bathtime Magic (1990)
 Christmas Magic (1990)
 Dancin' Magic (1991)
 The Stars of Discovery Music (with Bethie and Dennis Hysom) (1993)
 Jump for Joy: Joanie's Jukebox Cafe (1993)
 Adventures with Friends and Family (1996)
 Put Your Dancing Shoes On (2001)
 Angels of December (with Thom Rotella) (2002)
 Dreamland (2002)
 Jazzy (2005)

Singles

Sillytime Magic (1980) 
 "Animal Crackers in My Soup"
 "Sillie Pie"
 "The Name Game"
 "Swingin' the Alphabet"
 "Swinging on a Star"

Morning Magic (1986) 
 "Put on a Happy Face"

Lullaby Magic, Vol. 2 (1987) 
 "Somewhere Over the Rainbow"

Travelin' Magic (1988) 
 "On the Road to Where We're Going"
 "Beep Beep"

Bathtime Magic (1990) 
 "Splish Splash"

Dancin' Magic (1991) 
 "Limbo Rock"
 "Dinosaur Rock N' Roll"
 "The Martian Hop"
 "Happy Feet"
 "The Loco-Motion"
 "Barefootin'"
 "La Bamba"

Filmography

Videos 
 Simply Magic: The Rainy Day Adventure (1993) – Herself, various roles
 Simply Magic: The Extra-Special Substitute Teacher (1994) – Herself, various roles
 Recycle Wranglers (1997) - Herself

Television appearances 
Bartels has been a guest on several television shows and channels, such as Good Morning America on ABC, The Today Show on NBC, Storytime on PBS, CNN, Disney Channel and Music City Tonight on TNN.

References

External links 
 

1953 births
21st-century American women singers
Actresses from Boston
American children's musicians
American emigrants to New Zealand
American women singer-songwriters
American film actresses
American women pop singers
Discovery Records artists
Living people
Musicians from Boston
Musicians from Los Angeles
Rounder Records artists
Singer-songwriters from Massachusetts
Singer-songwriters from California
Sony BMG artists